Malacca Art Gallery is an art gallery in Malacca City, Malacca, Malaysia which was established in 1958. It is located on the upper floor of the building, which houses the Malaysia Youth Museum at the ground floor and was originally established as the administrative office of Dutch Malacca government.

The permanent section of the gallery exhibits around 150 paintings and 30 sculptures produced by famous Malaysian artists, such as Rafie Abd Rahman, Wan Hui-jyu, Rahmat Ramli, Rafie Abd Ghani and Jehan Chan. Foreign artists displayed including Gerard Van Den Oetelaar from the Netherlands. The gallery also regularly exhibits other exhibitions such as calligraphy, movie etc.

See also
 List of tourist attractions in Malacca
 Penang State Museum and Art Gallery

References

1958 establishments in Malaya
Art museums and galleries in Melaka
Buildings and structures in Malacca City